Fallin Brothers Building is a historic commercial building located at Springfield, Greene County, Missouri. It was built about 1919, and is a large two-story, brick building on a concrete foundation.  It has open storefronts and large garage doors on the ground floor and a corbelled brick cornice.

It was listed on the National Register of Historic Places in 2012.

References

Commercial buildings on the National Register of Historic Places in Missouri
Commercial buildings completed in 1919
Buildings and structures in Springfield, Missouri
National Register of Historic Places in Greene County, Missouri